Brunswick Hills Township is one of the seventeen townships of Medina County, Ohio, United States.  The 2000 census found 5,469 people in the township.

Geography
Located in the northern part of the county, it borders the following townships and cities:
Strongsville - north
North Royalton - northeast corner
Hinckley Township - east
Granger Township - southeast corner
Medina Township - south
York Township - southwest corner
Liverpool Township - west
Columbia Township, Lorain County - northwest corner

The city of Brunswick occupies the center and northeast of the township.

Name and history
Brunswick Hills Township was originally called Brunswick Township, and under the latter name was established in 1818.  It was renamed Brunswick Hills Township in 1960. It is the only Brunswick Hills Township statewide.

Government
The township is governed by a three-member board of trustees, who are elected in November of odd-numbered years to a four-year term beginning on the following January 1. Two are elected in the year after the presidential election and one is elected in the year before it. There is also an elected township fiscal officer, who serves a four-year term beginning on April 1 of the year after the election, which is held in November of the year before the presidential election. Vacancies in the fiscal officership or on the board of trustees are filled by the remaining trustees.

References

External links
Township website
County website

Townships in Medina County, Ohio
Townships in Ohio